Stranded is a 1987 American science fiction horror film directed by Tex Fuller, written by Alan Castle, and starring Ione Skye, Maureen O'Sullivan, Joe Morton, Susan Barnes, Cameron Dye, and Michael Greene. It was released on November 20, 1987, by New Line Cinema.

Plot
A grandmother, Grace Clark, and granddaughter, Deirdre Clark, live on a remote farm in the remote American South. They find themselves hostages of a family of aliens who crash land near their home. The aliens are escapees from a war-torn world hoping to hide on Earth. Due to a misunderstanding, the aliens kill the granddaughter's boyfriend, and this leads to their discovery and being attacked by the locals.

The locals have been worked into a frenzy by the killed boy's father, a local hothead, which quickly devolves into a hostage situation. Hollis McMann, an African-American sheriff, tries to control the situation and get everyone, aliens included, out alive. His efforts are made more difficult by the alien family's robot guard, an alien assassin from the family's home world, and the prejudice of his own deputies and the locals.

Cast

Reception
The Washington Post found the film to be the kind of "picture a company will just throw out into the market, hoping to cop a quick buck". It found the acting, direction, special effects, and lighting to be lacking. Creature Feature gave the movie 3 out of 5 stars, finding it an entertaining and respectable piece of work. Moria found the film to be a disappointment and amateurish, especially the direction, pacing, and writing.

See also
Night Skies

References

1987 films
1980s English-language films
American science fiction films
1980s science fiction films
New Line Cinema films
1980s American films